Tappeh Kanan (also Romanized as Tappeh Kan‘ān) is a village in Sarqaleh Rural District, Ozgoleh District, Salas-e Babajani County, Kermanshah Province, Iran. At the 2006 census, its population was 98, in 15 families.

References 

Populated places in Salas-e Babajani County